Two Fabulous Fools is the third studio album by Korean jazz band Winterplay, first released on July 17, 2013, in Korea. It was released in China, Hong Kong, Makau, and Taiwan after Winterplay signed a contract with Universal Music. The album contains ten songs by Winterplay. The vocalist on all tracks is Haewon Moon.

Commercial performance
The song, "Shake It Up and Down", first ranked on international play chart in the best Hong Kong pop music chart, Commercial Radio. The album ranked number one on Hong Kong HMV jazz chart and number two on Hong Kong record Classic Chart.

Music videos

Track listing

References

External links
 Official Website

2013 albums
Winterplay albums
Genie Music albums